Neurotypical is a 2013 documentary film directed by Adam Larsen. The film shows perspectives on life from the viewpoint of individuals on the autism spectrum. Neurotypical was shot mostly in North Carolina and Virginia.

Cast
 Wolf Dunaway as himself
 Violet as herself
 Nicholas as himself
 Paula as herself
 Maddi as herself
 John as himself

External links
 
 https://www.pbs.org/pov/neurotypical/film_description.php Summary of film on PBS's POV web site
 http://northdallasgazette.com/2013/07/27/povs-neurotypical-looks-at-the-world-through-the-eyes-of-the-autistic/ film review
 http://www.salon.com/2013/07/29/are_any_of_us_really_neurotypical/ film review
 http://richmondfamilymagazine.com/rfm-community/povs-neurotypical/ film review
 http://rewire.tpt.org/2013/07/29/povs-neurotypical-examines-what-it-means-to-be-different/ film review
 https://www.regonline.com/builder/site/tab1.aspx?EventID=1268236 film review

2013 films
American documentary films
American independent films
2013 documentary films
Documentary films about autism
2010s English-language films
2010s American films
2013 independent films
English-language documentary films